Juma Al Majid Holding Group is an Emirati holding company and a UAE based business conglomerate headquartered in Dubai. It was established in the year 1950. Juma Al Majid Group comprises 33 companies with 150 branches in the UAE and GCC operating in automotive, real estate development, contracting and construction services, FMCG, distribution, travel, retail, hospitality and tourism.  It was founded by H.E. Juma Al Majid, an Emirati businessman, political adviser, and philanthropist.

History

Juma Al Majid Holding Group of companies started in the year 1950. Juma Al Majid is the founder and chairman of the company. During the early years, the organization was primarily into trading activities. As the Emirates forged themselves into a single nation, the company diversified into other areas of commercial activity. For this, investment was undertaken in the sector of construction. Juma Al Majid partnership ventures now operate in the fields of construction, food-Imports, general trading, travel, and other industries. The group is also active in financial investments and portfolio management in UAE and globally.

Timeline

 1950:  The Juma Al Majid Holding Group is established by H.E. Juma Al Majid.

 1950:  The Home Appliances Division is set up, representing premium international brands in the UAE.

 1958: The Group’s Tyres & Batteries Division is established and signs agreement for the distribution of Yokohama Tyres in the UAE.

 1962: The Group enters into the FMCG sector by establishing GULFCO (Gulf Trading & Refrigerating Co. LLC).

 1964: Gulfco gets appointed as the exclusive distributor for S C Johnson’s home and personal care brands in the UAE.

 1965: Gulfco’s signs distribution agreement with Nestle's Perrier & Vittel.

 1967: The Group establishes General Navigation & Commerce Co. (GENAVCO) L.L.C for the supply of commercial vehicles, road construction equipment, quarry and mining equipment, material handling equipment, lubricants, and other industrial equipment. GENAVCO signs exclusive distribution agreements with MTU, Allison Transmission, BP oil lubricants.

 1971: The Group’s Contracting & Services Sector establishes Al Arabia for Technical Supplies & Contracts providing technical items involving Air Conditioning Systems, Building materials & AC Accessories.

 1971: Al Arabia Electro Mechanical LLC is established to cater to the ever-growing demands of the UAE construction industry.

 1972: Gulfco is appointed as distributor for Wrigley Confectionery in the UAE. Gulf Development & Construction (INMA) LLC is established in the construction and industrial sector.

 1976: The Group’s Watches division signs an exclusive agreement for the distribution of Citizen watches in the UAE.

 1977: Al Majid Ellis is established later renamed as Al Arabia for Safety & Security L.L.C.

 1980: The Group’s Office Equipment division enters the Storage, Material Handling & Filing Solutions market by partnering with Kardex.

 1981: The Group establishes Al Majid Travel, a full-service travel agency.

 1989: Juma Al Majid Centre for Culture & Heritage is established.

 1990: The Group’s Travel & Tourism vertical establishes Sky Line Travel & Tourism LLC.

 1997: Al Majid Property is established. Al Maarifa Mechanical Electrical Building Maintenance Co. LLC is established.

 1999: Awafi Foodstuff lnd. Co. L.L.C. is set up.

References

Companies based in Dubai

Privately held companies of the United Arab Emirates

Conglomerate companies established in 1950

Conglomerate companies of the United Arab Emirates